The women's 500 metres in speed skating at the 1998 Winter Olympics took place on 13 and 14 February, at the M-Wave.

Records
Prior to this competition, the existing world and Olympic records were as follows:

The following new Olympic records were set during this competition.

Results

References

Women's speed skating at the 1998 Winter Olympics
Women's events at the 1998 Winter Olympics